Bosanquet may refer to:

 Bosanquet (surname)
 Bosanquet, Ontario, a former township in Canada
County of Bosanquet, a cadastral unit in South Australia.